Fuck Love may refer to:

 F*ck Love, a 2020 mixtape by the Kid Laroi
 "Fuck Love" (song), a 2017 song by American rappers XXXTentacion and Trippie Redd
 "Fuck Love", a song by All That Remains from the 2018 album Victim of the New Disease
 "Fuck Love", a song by Banks from the 2022 album Serpentina
 "Fuck Love", a song by Iggy Azalea from the 2014 album ''The New Classic